Chienkuo Technology University (CTU) is a private university located in Changhua City, Changhua County, Taiwan.

The university offers undergraduate and graduate programs in a variety of fields, including engineering, management, design, humanities, and social sciences. 

The university has a number of international partnerships and encourages its students to study abroad through exchange programs.

History
CTU was initially established in October 1965 as Chienkuo Commercial Junior College. It changed its name in August 1974 to Chienkuo Industrial Junior College and again in November 1992 as Chienkuo Industrial-and-Commercial Junior College. It underwent restructuring in August 1999 to become Chienkuo Institute of Technology. It finally changed its name to Chienkuo Technology University in August 2004. In 2020, the university had an enrollment rate of less than 60%.

Faculties
Faculties of the university are college of engineering, college of management, college of design and college of living technology.

Transportation
The university is accessible South East from Changhua Station of Taiwan Railways.

See also
 List of universities in Taiwan

References

External links

 

1965 establishments in Taiwan
Changhua City
Educational institutions established in 1965
Private universities and colleges in Taiwan
Universities and colleges in Changhua County
Universities and colleges in Taiwan
Technical universities and colleges in Taiwan